Events in the year 1955 in Bulgaria.

Incumbents 

 General Secretaries of the Bulgarian Communist Party: Todor Zhivkov
 Chairmen of the Council of Ministers: Valko Chervenkov

Events 

 July 27 – El Al Flight 402, an international passenger flight from London to Tel Aviv via Vienna and Istanbul, strayed into Bulgarian airspace and was shot down by two Bulgarian MiG-15 jet fighters. It later crashed near Petrich, killing all 7 crew and 51 passengers on board. The crash took place amid highly strained relations between the Eastern Bloc and the West and was the deadliest involving the Constellation at the time.
 December 14 – United Nations Security Council Resolution 109 is adopted, leading to the admission of Bulgaria and other countries into the United Nations.

Sports

References 

 
1950s in Bulgaria
Years of the 20th century in Bulgaria
Bulgaria
Bulgaria